Klågerup Castle is a mansion at Svedala Municipality in  Scania, Sweden.

History 
Klågerup  was owned in the early 15th century by Peter Spoldener. However, by the 18th century the building was in bad shape and by 1737 extensive restorations were commissioned by Fredrik Trolle. The current main building was constructed by Carl Axel Trolle under design by architect Helgo Zettervall (1831-1907) in French Renaissance style.

See also
List of castles in Sweden

References

 Buildings and structures in Skåne County